Jiangxi Subdistrict is a subdistrict in Xinwu District, Wuxi, Jiangsu province, China. , it has 26 residential communities, two villages, and two park communities under its administration.
Neighborhoods
Jingdu Community
Tangnan Community
Shuguang Community
Xingzhu Community
Dongfeng Community
Fenglei Community
Taihu Huayuan First Community
Taihu Huayuan Second Community
Xukangli Community
Yichun Community
Xufengli Community
Fangqian Community
Xufeng Jiayuan Community
Qianjin Community
Wanyuyuan First Community
Wanyuyuan Second Community
Xinfengyuan First Community
Xinfengyuan Second Community
Chuncheng Jiayuan Community
Dongfeng Jiayuan Community
Weixing Community
Tixiang Community
Chunnuan Community
Dingcheng Community
Chunyang Community
Huafeng Community

Villages
Yongfeng Village
Jingdu Village

Parks
Economic Development Park Community
Wuxi New District Industrial Expo Park Community

See also 
 List of township-level divisions of Jiangsu

References 

Township-level divisions of Jiangsu
Wuxi